Hagara may refer to:

 Roman Hagara, Austrian sailor
 Ara Gaya
 Geumgwan Gaya